Walnut Grove Township is an inactive township in Greene County, in the U.S. state of Missouri.

Walnut Grove Township takes its name from the community of Walnut Grove.

References

Townships in Missouri
Townships in Greene County, Missouri